Ellenbrook Secondary College (abbreviated as ESC) is an Independent public co-educational  high day school, located in the Perth suburb of Ellenbrook.

Overview
Ellenbrook Secondary College was established in 2007 in the fast growing suburb of Ellenbrook. It is built in the Ellenbrook town centre. It achieved Independent Public School status in 2015.

Programs
Ellenbrook Secondary College has a Department of Education approved specialist program for instrumental music and voice. Many graduates have gone on to attend the Western Australian Academy of Performing Arts.

Ellenbrook Secondary College is set to start a Department of Education approved Gifted and Talented Academic program in 2021, being one of 14 public schools in Western Australia to have one. The program will initially open for up to 32 Year 7 students.

Ellenbrook Secondary College also offers school based programs in STEM, Football and Netball.

Local intake area

Ellenbrook Secondary College's local intake area covers part of Aveley, part of Belhus, part of Brabham, part of Ellenbrook, Henley Brook and a small part of Whiteman. Students living in the local intake area have a guaranteed place at the school if they apply. Students living outside the local intake area can apply as well, but they will be accepted on a case by case basis.

Academic results

Student numbers

See also

 List of schools in the Perth metropolitan area

References

Public high schools in Perth, Western Australia
Educational institutions established in 2007
2007 establishments in Australia
Ellenbrook, Western Australia